The South Coast is a region of California, making up roughly the southernmost third of the Californian coast. It refers, for the most part, to the coastal parts of the Southern Californian counties of Ventura, Los Angeles, Orange, and San Diego.

See also 
 Central Coast (California)
 North Coast (California)
 South Coast Air Basin
 Southland
 Southern California

References

Regions of California
Geography of Los Angeles County, California
Geography of Orange County, California
Geography of Southern California
Greater Los Angeles
Southern California
West Coast of the United States